Anshei Glen Wild Synagogue is a small Orthodox synagogue built in the 1920s for a congregation established the previous decade. It is located on Glen Wild Road, Sullivan County Route 58, in the unincorporated community of Glen Wild, New York, United States. 

It was founded by a local family and has never had its own rabbi. The synagogue is preserved virtually intact from the time of its construction and was listed on the National Register of Historic Places in 1999.

Building

The synagogue is a single-story three-by-four-bay building on a concrete foundation with stucco siding and a gabled roof shingled in asphalt. A four-bay addition projects from the rear. The west (front) facade features a porch with bell-shaped roof supported by two round wooden columns rising from a concrete stoop. The porch's entablature features the name of the synagogue and a Star of David. Both sides and the original rear wall feature large round-arched windows with colored and opaque glass.

The ornately paneled wooden doors, surmounted by a colored fanlight, open onto a small vestibule. The remainder of the original block is used for the sanctuary, a barrel-vaulted square room. A chandelier hangs from the intersection of two iron tie rods at the bottom of the vault. The floor layout of the sanctuary follows Orthodox tradition, with the centrally-located bimah surrounded by pews with curved end panels on three sides, all of which face the Torah ark at the rear. Two or three have been set aside as the women's gallery.

Turned wooden posts on the elaborately decorated ark support a pedimented roof, where two carved, gilt Lions of Judah hold a scroll with the Ten Commandments topped by a large gilt crown. Both the ark platform and bimah are made of paneled wood with square posts.

History

As in other areas of Sullivan County, Jews began coming to the region, first to vacation and later to stay, around the turn of the 20th century. Among the early arrivals to the Glen Wild area, in 1904, were Simon Jaffe and his family, of Lithuanian descent like other Jews in the area. Since he had been a shochet, or ritual animal slaughterer, he helped establish the small congregation, of 13 members at first, in 1913.

Worshipers met in his house for over a decade before they began to talk about building a synagogue. A small parcel of land was acquired, and cornerstones were laid in 1921. Local contractor Jim Couch and Sons, neighbors of the Jaffes, handled the construction. The finished building, completed in 1923, reflects some characteristics of Sullivan County's Christian churches such as the gabled roof, but the window treatments and stucco finish link it to other synagogues of the period in the area, such as Hebrew Congregation of Mountaindale and South Fallsburg Hebrew Association Synagogue.

In 1955 a congregant, Louis Rosenblatt, donated money for the construction of the rear wing, to be used as a social hall. This has been the only change made to the building since 1923.

Since Anshei Glen Wild was a small congregation, it never hired its own rabbi. Simon Jaffe, a schoolteacher, conducted services and taught congregants' children Hebrew. His family continued to maintain the synagogue, although services were infrequent. The two dozen members focused much of their efforts on maintaining the nearby cemetery.

Around 2013 the synagogue was bought by artist Mike Osterhout and converted into an art studio.

See also
Anshei Israel Synagogue, a similar small rural synagogue in Lisbon, Connecticut.

References

Synagogues in Sullivan County, New York
Orthodox synagogues in New York (state)
Lithuanian-Jewish culture in New York (state)
National Register of Historic Places in Sullivan County, New York
Synagogues on the National Register of Historic Places in New York (state)
Jewish organizations established in 1913
1913 establishments in New York (state)
Synagogues completed in 1923
1923 establishments in New York (state)